Kevin Lamar Windham Jr. (born May 29, 1993) is a Democratic member of the Missouri General Assembly, originally elected from the state's 85th House district, and after redistricting in 2022, elected from the 74th district.

Personal 
Windham Jr. plays basketball for leisure and attributes his passion for politics in large part to his late great-grandmother, Rose Simon.

Education 
Windham Jr. graduated from Southeast Missouri State University. During college Windham served as a member of Student Government Association, Black Student Union, and the President’s Task Force on Diversity Education.

Windham Jr. has participated in the FOCUS St. Louis Impact Fellows program and University of Missouri Extension’s Neighborhood Leadership Fellows program.

Political career

Early career 
Prior to his legislative duties, Windham served the state of Missouri as a staffer in the offices of Missouri State Senator Maria Chappelle-Nadal and United States Senator Claire McCaskill.

State representative 
On August 7, 2018 Windham Jr. won the four-way Democratic primary for Missouri House of Representatives in District 85 to succeed Clem Smith with 43.7% of the vote. Windham Jr. won the general election on November 6, 2018, securing 82.4% of the vote. As an incoming legislator, Windham was elected vice-chair of the Missouri House Democratic Caucus for the 100th General Assembly.

Windham ran uncontested in the 2020 election for Missouri House of Representatives in District 85.

State committeeman 
In addition to his duties as state representative, Windham was elected to serve as State Committeeman of the 14th Senate District within the Missouri Democratic Party for the 2020-2022 term.

Electoral history

Legislative career

Legislative advocacy 
In his legislative duties Windham has focused on increasing access to higher education, criminal justice reform, and community revitalization.

Notable legislation 
Rep. Windham has proposed several progressive bills including HB 910 (2021) which would repeal state sales taxes on groceries while implementing an estate tax, HB1354 (2021) which would create the Missouri Office of Racial Equity, and HB 884 (2021) which would make Missouri's A+ Scholarship a first-dollar scholarship.

Committee assignments

2021-2022 

 Higher Education Committee
 Budget Committee
 Elections and Elected Officials Committee, Ranking Minority Member
 Subcommittee on Appropriations - Education
 Subcommittee on Federal Stimulus Spending

2019-2020 

 Elections and Elected Officials Committee
 Local Government Committee
 Transportation Committee
 Joint Committee on Transportation Oversight

Awards 

 Delux Magazine's Emerging 30 under 30
 Missouri Democratic Party's Young Democrat of the Year

References

21st-century American politicians
1993 births
Living people
Windham Jr., Kevin